Kenjiro Kitajima (October 5, 1893 – November 24, 1957) was Governor of the South Seas Mandate (1936–1940). He was also the Deputy Minister of Colonial Affairs. He was a graduate of the University of Tokyo. He was from Saga Prefecture.

References

Governors of the South Seas Mandate
1893 births
1957 deaths
University of Tokyo alumni
People from Saga Prefecture
South Seas Mandate in World War II